John Joseph Vernon (26 September 1918 – 24 August 1981) also referred to as Jackie Vernon, was an Irish footballer who played for, among others, Belfast Celtic and West Bromwich Albion. Vernon was a dual international and played for both Ireland teams – the IFA XI and the FAI XI. He also played on two occasions for a Great Britain XI.

Club career

Early years
Vernon was born in Jocelyn Avenue, Belfast and when he left school he initially entered the family butcher business. He would eventually return to the same trade after retiring as a player. Vernon also played as a junior with both Spearmint and Dundela. His performances attracted the interest of Liverpool but he rejected their approach and opted to sign for Belfast Celtic instead.

Belfast Celtic
Together with Jimmy McAlinden, Billy McMillan, Tommy Breen and Charlie Tully, he was a prominent member of the Celtic team managed by Elisha Scott. This team dominated the Irish League during the Second World War era. He played his last game for Celtic on 8 February 1947 against Linfield. Both West Bromwich Albion and Glasgow Celtic declared an interest in signing Vernon but the Celtic manager, Jimmy McGrory, would not meet Belfast Celtic's £8,000 valuation.

West Bromwich Albion
Vernon eventually signed for West Bromwich Albion in February 1947 for a club record fee of £9,500. In 1949 he captained a West Brom team that also included Davy Walsh and Reg Ryan to promotion from the English Second Division. In the same season he also scored his only goal for the club, on Christmas Day in a 1–0 win against Sheffield Wednesday. 
On 8 June 1947, together with Davy Walsh, Vernon guested for Shamrock Rovers in a friendly against Everton.

Crusaders
In 1952 Vernon returned to the Irish League and became player-manager at Crusaders, the club that in 1949 had replaced Belfast Celtic in the league. In 1954 he guided the club to victory in the Ulster Cup, their first ever senior trophy. He left the club at the end of that season and returned to the butcher trade.

International career
When Vernon began his international career in 1944 there were in effect, two Ireland teams, chosen by two rival associations. Both associations, the Northern Ireland – based IFA and the Ireland – based FAI claimed jurisdiction over the whole of Ireland and selected players from the whole island. As a result, several notable Irish players from this era, including Vernon played for both teams. In addition Vernon also played twice for a Great Britain XI.

IFA XI
Between 1944 and 1951, Vernon made 21 appearances for the IFA XI. He made his debut in an 8–4 defeat against a Combined Services XI at Windsor Park on 9 September 1944. This team was basically a Great Britain XI and featured, among others, Matt Busby, Stanley Matthews, Tommy Lawton and Stan Mortensen. During the 1945–46 season he also played in the three Victory internationals. On 27 November 1946 he helped the IFA XI gain a 0–0 draw with Scotland. The draw helped the IFA XI finish as runners-up in the 1947 British Home Championship. Vernon also helped the IFA XI gain some further respectable results, including a 2–0 win against Scotland on 4 October 1947 and a 2–2 draw with England at Goodison Park on 5 November 1947. On 12 May 1951 he also helped the IFA XI gain a 2–2 draw with France. Vernon played his last game for the IFA XI on 20 November 1951 in a 2–0 defeat to England.

FAI XI
In 1946 Vernon also made 2 appearances for the FAI XI. He was one of several players born in Northern Ireland who benefited from the FAI's attempts to establish an all-Ireland influence. In June 1946 when the FAI organised an Iberian tour, Vernon, together with Jimmy McAlinden, Billy McMillan and Paddy Sloan, was one of four Northern Irish players called up. Vernon subsequently played in both the 3–1 defeat to Portugal on 16 June and then helped the FAI XI gain a 1–0 victory against Spain on 23 June.

Great Britain XI
On 10 May 1947, Vernon, together with Stanley Matthews, Wilf Mannion, Tommy Lawton and Billy Liddell, played for a Great Britain XI against a Europe XI at Hampden Park. The game was arranged to celebrate England, Scotland, Wales and Ireland rejoining FIFA. On 3 December 1951 at Ninian Park he also captained a Great Britain XI against Wales as the Football Association of Wales celebrated their 75th anniversary.

Honours

As a player
Belfast Celtic
 Irish League: 1940–41, 1941–42, 1942–43, 1943–44, 1946–47
 Irish Cup: 1941, 1943
 County Antrim Shield: 1942–43, 1944–45

West Bromwich Albion
 Second Division runners-up: 1948–49

Ireland
 British Home Championship runners-up: 1946–47

As player-manager
Crusaders
Ulster Cup: 1953–54

References

External links
Northern Ireland Footballing Greats

1918 births
1981 deaths
Association footballers from Belfast
Association football central defenders
Association footballers from Northern Ireland
Dual Irish international footballers
Pre-1950 IFA international footballers
Northern Ireland international footballers
Ireland (FAI) international footballers
Republic of Ireland international footballers from Northern Ireland
Belfast Celtic F.C. players
Crusaders F.C. players
West Bromwich Albion F.C. players
Crusaders F.C. managers
Football managers from Northern Ireland
Shamrock Rovers F.C. guest players
Ireland (IFA) wartime international footballers